—Closing lines of "Easter, 1916" by W. B. Yeats

Nationality words link to articles with information on the nation's poetry or literature (for instance, Irish or France).

Events
 February 5 – Cabaret Voltaire is opened by German performance poet Hugo Ball and his future wife Emmy Hennings in the back room of Ephraim Jan's Holländische Meierei in Zürich, Switzerland; although surviving only until the summer it is pivotal in the creation of the Dada movement in art, poetry and literature. Tristan Tzara, Marcel Janco, Richard Huelsenbeck, Sophie Taeuber-Arp and Jean Arp are among those who gather here to discuss art and put on performances expressing their disgust with World War I and the interests they believe have inspired it.
 March
 Guillaume Apollinaire (Wilhelm Apollinaris de Kostrowitzky) is wounded in the head by shell fragments while serving as a lieutenant in the French infantry on the Western Front (World War I).
 The first poems of English children's author Enid Blyton are published, in Nash's Magazine.
 March 10 – Sir Hubert Parry writes the choral setting of William Blake's poem "And did those feet in ancient time" (c.1804-08) which becomes known as "Jerusalem" (first performed 28 March at the Queen's Hall, London).
 March 30 – Don Marquis introduces the characters Archy and Mehitabel in his "The Sun Dial" column in The Evening Sun (New York City); archy is a poetry-writing cockroach unable to operate the typewriter shift key.
 April 24–30 – Easter Rising in Ireland: Members of the Irish Republican Brotherhood proclaim an Irish Republic and the Irish Volunteers and Irish Citizen Army occupy the General Post Office and other buildings in Dublin before surrendering to the British Army. Of the seven leaders of the Rising (subsequently executed), Thomas MacDonagh, Patrick Pearse and Joseph Plunkett are all poets and James Connolly a balladeer. The event is the theme of W. B. Yeats' poem "Easter, 1916", first published this September.
 July 1
 First day on the Somme: Poets W. N. Hodgson, Will Streets, Gilbert Waterhouse, Henry Field, Alfred Ratcliffe, Alexander Robertson and Bernard White are among the 19,000 British soldiers killed on this day alone. The Battle of the Somme continues until October 18, during which time American poet Alan Seeger (serving with the French), English poet Edward Tennant, and short-story writer H. H. Munro ("Saki") are killed, Robert Graves is seriously wounded (believed killed), David Jones receives physical and psychological injuries, Ford Madox Hueffer suffers concussion and shellshock, A. A. Milne and J. R. R. Tolkien are invalided out, Siegfried Sassoon wins the Military Cross, and Cameron Highlander Dòmhnall Ruadh Chorùna composes the Scottish Gaelic love song An Eala Bhàn ("The White Swan") in the oral literature tradition.
 W. B. Yeats makes his fifth and final proposal of marriage to the newly widowed Maud Gonne in France.
 July 14 – Hugo Ball recites the Dada manifesto in Zürich.
 August 17 – English poet F. W. Harvey becomes a prisoner of war.
 October 6 – Romanian poet and critic Perpessicius loses his right arm while fighting in a skirmish at Muratan.
 When Wallace Stevens' job as a lawyer for a New York City insurance company is abolished as a result of mergers, he joins the home office of Hartford Accident and Indemnity Company and moves to Hartford, Connecticut, where he will remain the rest of his life.

Works published in English

Canada
 Bliss Carman, April Airs: A Book of New England Lyrics, Boston: Small, Maynard and Co.; Canadian poet published in the United States
 Thomas O'Hagan, Songs of Heroic Days, Toronto: McClelland, Goodchild and Stewart
 Marjorie Pickthall, The Lamp of Poor Souls and Other Poems.
 Duncan Campbell Scott, Lundy's Lane and Other Poems, including "The Height of Land"
 Frederick George Scott, In the Battle Silences: Poems Written at the Front (Toronto: Musson)
 Robert W. Service, Rhymes of a Red Cross Man.

United Kingdom
From Before Action by W. N. Hodgson
I, that on my familiar hill
Saw with uncomprehending eyes
A hundred of thy sunsets spill
Their fresh and sanguine sacrifice,
Ere the sun swings his noonday sword
Must say good-bye to all of this; –
By all delights that I shall miss,
Help me to die, O Lord.

-- last verse; produced two days before the poet's death at the First day on the Somme

 Laurence Binyon, The Anvil, and Other Poems
 Edmund Blunden, Pastorals
 Robert Bridges (ed.), The Spirit of Man: an anthology in English & French from the philosophers & poets, made by the Poet Laureate in 1915
 Émile Cammaerts, New Belgian Poems: Les trois rois et autres poèmes, expatriate Francophone Belgian poet translated into English
 Mary Gabrielle Collins, Branches unto the Sea
 Elizabeth Daryush, Verses
 W. H. Davies:
 Child Lovers, and Other Poems
 Collected Poems
 Eleanor Farjeon, Nursery Rhymes of London Town
 Robert Graves, Over the Brazier
 Thomas Hardy, Selected Poems
 F. W. Harvey, A Gloucestershire Lad At Home and Abroad
 Aldous Huxley, The Burning Wheel
 D. H. Lawrence, Amores
 Joseph Lee, Ballads of Battle, Scottish poet
 Winifred Mary Letts, Hallow-e'en and Poems of the War (including "The Spires of Oxford")
 Charlotte Mew, The Farmer's Bride
 Jessie Pope, Simple Rhymes for Stirring Times
 Lady Margaret Sackville, The Pageant of War
 Dorothy L. Sayers, Op. 1
 Edith Sitwell and Osbert Sitwell, Twentieth Century Harlequinade, and Other Poems
 The first Wheels poetry anthology Wheels 1916 edited by the Sitwells.
 Cicily Fox Smith, Fighting Men
 Charles Hamilton Sorley, Marlborough and Other Poems (posthumous)
 Muriel Stuart, Christ at Carnival and Other Poems
 Rabindranath Tagore, Fruit Gathering, lyrics translated by the author into English from the original Bengali (Indian poetry in English)
 Edward Tennant, Worple Flit and other poems (posthumous)
 Edward Thomas, Six Poems, his first published poetry (under the pen name 'Edward Eastaway')
 Aelfrida Tillyard, The Garden and the Fire
 Katharine Tynan, The Holy War
 Gilbert Waterhouse, Rail-Head and other poems (posthumous)
 Evelyn Waugh, The World to Come: A Poem in Three Cantos (written at age 12; privately printed)
 Anna Wickham, The Man With A Hammer
 Alfred Williams, War Sonnets and Songs
 W. B. Yeats, Irish poet published in the United Kingdom:
 "Easter, 1916"
 Responsibilities and Other Poems
 Reveries Over Childhood and Youth
 Some Imagist Poets second anthology

United States
From The Road Not Taken by Robert Frost
I shall be telling this with a sigh
Somewhere ages and ages hence:
Two roads diverged in a wood, and I—
I took the one less traveled by,
And that has made all the difference.

-- last verse (lines 16-20)
 Conrad Aiken:
 Turns and Movies
 The Jig of Forslin
 James Branch Cabell, From the Hidden Way
 Florence Earle Coates (1850–1927), Poems (collected edition in two volumes)
 J. W. Cunliffe, editor, Poems of the Great War
 Hilda Doolittle (also known as "H.D."), Sea Garden
 John Gould Fletcher, Goblins and Pagodas
 Robert Frost, Mountain Interval, including "The Road Not Taken" and "Out, Out—"
 Edgar A. Guest, A Heap o' Livin'''
 Robinson Jeffers, Californians Sarah Orne Jewett, Verses, published posthumously (died 1909)
From Chicagoby Carl Sandburg
Hog Butcher for the World,  	
Tool Maker, Stacker of Wheat, 	
Player with Railroads and the Nation's Freight Handler; 	
Stormy, husky, brawling, 	
City of the Big Shoulders:

They tell me you are wicked and I believe them, for I have 
seen your painted women under the gas lamps luring
the farm boys.
And they tell me you are crooked and I answer: Yes it is
true I have seen the gunman kill and go free to kill again.

-- Lines 1-7
 Alfred Kreymborg, Mushrooms Amy Lowell, Men, Women and Ghosts Edgar Lee Masters:
 Songs and Satires The Great Valley Emanuel Morgan and Anne Knish, both pen names, Spectra: A Book of Poetic Experiments James Oppenheim, War and Laughter Josephine Preston Peabody, Harvest Moon Ezra Pound, Lustra Edward Arlington Robinson, The Man Against the Sky Carl Sandburg, Chicago Poems, Holt, Rinehart and Winston; including "Chicago"
 Alan Seeger, PoemsOther in English
 C. J. Dennis, The Moods of Ginger Mick, Australia
 W. Walter Gill, Juan-y-Pherick’s Journey and Other Poems, Isle of Man
 N. C. Rai, An Indian Tale, a tale of rural life; Calcutta; India, Indian poetry in English
 Rabindranath Tagore, Fruit Gathering lyrics translated by the author into English from the original Bengali; India, Indian poetry in English
 W. B. Yeats, Irish poet published in the United Kingdom:
 "Easter, 1916"
 Responsibilities and Other Poems Reveries Over Childhood and Youth Joseph Furphy and Kate Baker – The Poems of Joseph Furphy, Australia

Works published in other languages

France
 Jean Cocteau, Discours du Grand Sommeil, a poem written after experience as a Red Cross ambulance driver at the Belgian front in World War I
 Francis Jammes, Cinq prières pour le temps de la guerre, Paris: Librairie de l'Art catholique
 Pierre Reverdy, La Lucarne ovaleIndian subcontinent
Including all of the British colonies that later became India, Pakistan, Bangladesh, Sri Lanka and Nepal. Listed alphabetically by first name, regardless of surname:
 B. Tirumal, Angala jarmani-yuddha vivaranam, Sanskrit-language epic poem on World War I (India)
 Kavikondala Venkata Rao, Vividha Kusumavali, Telugu-language (India), a collection of khandikas Lalchand Amardinomal Jagatiani , Sunharo Sacal, Sindhi-language essays of criticism and biography on the life and work of Sachal Sarmast, a Sindhi poet (India)
 Lekhnath Ponday, Rtuvicar, Nepali-language
 Rabindranath Thakur, Balaka, Bengali-language (India)
 Rayaprolu Subba Rao, editor, Andhravali, a Telugu-language anthology (India)

Other
 Olav Aukrust, Himmelvarden, Norwegian poet writing in Nynorsk
 Hugo Ball, "Karawane", German poet in Switzerland writing in nonsense words
 José María Eguren, La canción de las figuras, Peru
 Albert Ehrenstein, Der Mensch schreit and Nicht da nicht dort, Germany
 Yvan Goll, Requiem pour les morts de l’Europe, German poet in Switzerland writing in French
 Nikolay Gumilyov, The Quiver, Russia
 Vicente Huidobro, Adán, Chile
 Joseph Lenoir-Rolland, Poèmes épars, lyrics; French language; Canada
 Antonio Machado, Campos de Castilla (revised edition), Spain
 Vladimir Mayakovsky, The Backbone Flute (Fleyta pozvonochnik) and War and the World (Voina i mir), Russian
 1914–1916: Eine Anthologie, Germany
 Martinus Nijhoff, De wandelaar, Netherlands
 Sergei Yesenin, Radunitsa (Радуница, "Ritual for the Dead"), his first book of poetry, Russian

Births
Death years link to the corresponding "[year] in poetry" article:
 January 10
 William Buchan, 3rd Baron Tweedsmuir, also known as "William Tweedsmuir" (died 2008), English peer and author of novels, short stories, memoirs and verse
 Bernard Binlin Dadié (died 2019), Ivorien author and politician
 January 12 – Mary Wilson (died 2018), English prime ministerial spose and poet
 February 1 – Venibhai Purohit (died 1980), Indian, Gujarati-language
 February 4 – Gavin Ewart (died 1995), English
 February 10 – Thomas Blackburn (died 1977), English
 March 7 – Balmukund Dave (died 1993), Indian, Gujarati-language poet
 March 11 – Jack Clemo (died 1994), English poet of Cornwall
 May 9 – Helen Haenke (died 1978), Australian poet and playwright
 June 14 – John Ciardi (died 1986), American poet, translator and etymologist
 June 15 – Hari Daryani, "Dilgir" (died 2004), Indian, Sindhi-language poet
 July 6 – Harold Norse (died 2009), American poet and memoirist; writes seminal memoir of the Beat poets in Paris
 August 1
 Anne Hébert (died 2000), Canadian, French language
 Val Vallis (died 2009), Australian
 August 29 – Rhydwen Williams (died 1997), Welsh poet, novelist and minister of religion
 September 8 – Philip O'Connor (died 1998), English writer and surrealist poet
 September 13 – John Malcolm Brinnin (died 1998), American poet and literary critic
 September 24 – W. J. Gruffydd (Elerydd) (died 2011), Welsh
 September 25 – Paul Roche (died 2007), English poet, translator and academic associated with the Bloomsbury Group
 October 10 – Samar Sen, সমর সেন (died 1987), Bengali poet and journalist
 October 16 – David Gascoyne (died 2001), English author and poet
 November 23 – P. K. Page (died 2010), Canadian
 December 14 – Harold Stewart (died 1995), Australian
 December 21 – Maurice Chappaz (died 2009), Swiss, French-language poet, travel writer, translator and author
 Also:
 Ghulam Nabi Aziz (died 1965), Indian, Kashmiri-language poet, nephew of Abdul Ahad Azad
 Jnanindra Barma (died 1990), Indian, Oriya-language poet
 Ghulam Nabi Dilsoz  (died 1941), Indian, Kashmiri-language poet
 Margaret Irvin, Australian
 Sheikh Davud Kavi, Indian, Telugu-language poet, scholar and translator
 Sankeevani Marathi, Indian, Marathi-language
 Dina Nath Kaul Nadim (died 1987), Indian, Kashmiri-language poet
 Felix Paul Noronha, Indian, Marathi-language poet in the Konkani dialect
 Lal Chand Prarthi (died 1982), Indian, Dogri-language Pahadi poet and editor
 Tom Rawling (died 1996), English poet and angler
 Pinakin Thakore, Indian, Gujarati-language poet
 Pritam Singh Safir (died 1999), Indian, Punjabi-language poet
 Raghunath Vishnu Pandit (died 1990), Indian, Konkani language poet also writing in Marathi, modernist poet, novelist, short-story writer and essayist
 Takis Varvitsiotis (died 2011), Greek poet

Deaths
Note "Killed in World War I" subsection, below. Birth years link to the corresponding "[year] in poetry" article:
 February 7 – William Little (born 1839), English-born Australian
 February 12 – John Townsend Trowbridge (born 1827), American poet and author
 March 11 – Duncan MacGregor Crerar (born 1836), Scottish
 April 26 – Mário de Sá-Carneiro (born 1890), Portuguese-born poet and novelist, suicide
 July 1? – Arabella Eugenia Smith (born 1844), American
 August 27 – Petar Kočić (born 1877), Bosnian Serb
 October 7 – James Whitcomb Riley (born 1849), American
 October 21 – Olindo Guerrini (born 1845), Italian
 October 25 – John Todhunter (born 1839), Irish poet and playwright
 November 27 – Emile Verhaeren (born 1855), Belgian French language Symbolist poet
 December 9 – Natsume Sōseki 夏目 漱石 (commonly referred to as "Sōseki"), pen name of Natsume Kinnosuke 夏目金之助 (born 1867), Japanese Meiji Era novelist, haiku poet, composer of Chinese-style poetry, writer of fairy tales and a scholar of English literature; from 1984–2004, his portrait will feature on the 1000 yen note
 Also:
 Sacchindananda Tribhuban Deb (born 1872), Indian Oriya-language poet, patron of Oriya literature and ruler of Bamanda, a feudal state in Sambalpur District
 Asad Pare, Indian, Kashmiri-language, Sufi

Killed in World War I
 January 24 – H. Rex Freston (born 1891), English poet
 January 27 – C. Morton Horne (born 1885), Irish-born musical comedy performer, writer and war poet
 May 31 – Gorch Fock (born 1880), German poet and novelist
 July 1 – First day on the Somme:
 W. N. Hodgson (born 1893), English war poet
 Will Streets (born 1886), English war poet
 Gilbert Waterhouse (born 1883), English architect and war poet, second lieutenant in 2nd Bn Essex Regiment
 July 4 – Alan Seeger (born 1888), American poet who joined the French Foreign Legion in 1914 and died in battle, cheering on his fellow soldiers after being hit; uncle of American folk singer Pete Seeger
 September 9 – Tom Kettle (born 1880), Irish writer and politician
 September 22 – Edward Tennant (born 1897), English war poet
 November 14 – H. H. Munro ("Saki"; born 1870), English poet, short story writer, novelist and playwright
 December 3 – Geoffrey Bache Smith (born 1894), English poet

Awards and honors
 Nobel Prize for Literature: Carl Gustaf Verner von Heidenstam, Swedish poet and novelist

See also

 List of years in poetry
 Dada
 Imagism
 Modernist poetry in English
 Silver Age of Russian Poetry
 Ego-Futurism movement in Russian poetry
 Expressionism movement in German poetry
 Young Poland (Polish: Młoda Polska'') modernist period in Polish  arts and literature
 Poetry

Notes

Poetry
20th-century poetry